Wingate is a town in Union County, North Carolina, United States. The population was 3,491 at the 2010 census.

History
The Wingate Commercial Historic District was listed on the National Register of Historic Places in 2014.  It is named for Washington Manly Wingate.

Geography
Wingate is located at  (34.985021, -80.447254).

Wingate is drained by tributaries to Richardson Creek, including Rays Fork and Meadow Branch.

Demographics

2020 census

As of the 2020 United States census, there were 4,055 people, 1,002 households, and 693 families residing in the town.

2000 census
As of the census of 2000, there were 2,406 people, 751 households, and 464 families residing in the town. The population density was 1,430.2 people per square mile (553.0/km²). There were 825 housing units at an average density of 490.4 per square mile (189.6/km²). The racial makeup of the town was 60.6% White, 28.8% African American, 0.4% Native American, 0.9% Asian, 7.9% from other races, and 1.4% from two or more races. Hispanic or Latino of any race were 12.4% of the population.

There were 751 households, out of which 30.0% had children under the age of 18 living with them, 41.0% were married couples  living together, 17.2% had a female householder with no husband present, and 38.1% were non-families. 27.4% of all households were made up of individuals, and 12.5% had someone living alone who was 65 years of age or older. The average household size was 2.46 and the average family size was 2.99.

In the town, the population was spread out, with 18.7% under the age of 18, 35.0% from 18 to 24, 21.7% from 25 to 44, 15.6% from 45 to 64, and 8.9% who were 65 years of age or older. The median age was 23 years. For every 100 females there were 93.9 males. For every 100 females age 18 and over, there were 93.0 males.

The median income for a household in the town was $33,750, and the median income for a family was $45,250. Males had a median income of $33,173 versus $22,708 for females. The per capita income for the town was $13,884. About 13.8% of families and 20.0% of the population were below the poverty line, including 20.9% of those under age 18 and 21.0% of those age 65 or over.

The town is known mainly for Wingate University and the Jesse Helms Center, K-Ci & JoJo and Walter Collin Burleson.

References

External links
 Official website of Wingate, NC
 Official website of the Wingate Fire Department
 Official website of Wingate University
 Official website of the Jesse Helms Center

Towns in Union County, North Carolina
Towns in North Carolina